"Travesuras" is a song by American singer Nicky Jam,  taken from the compilation albums  Nicky Jam Hits and Greatest Hits, Vol. 1. It was released as the album's lead single on January 27, 2014 through Sony Music Latin and RCA Records. The song was commercially successful throughout countries in Latin America, reaching the top spot on the charts in Colombia and peaking within the top five on the Billboard Hot Latin Songs chart. The single is Jam's first song to reach the top ten on the Billboard Hot Latin Songs chart.

Music video
The music video for "Travesuras" was released on July 3, 2014 on Nicky Jam's YouTube account. It was shot in Medellín, Colombia and currently exceeds 1 billion views. In the video, Jam cares for a girl who wants to sell a luxury property. Parts of the video were recorded in the inside of the property and others on roads of the city where he drives a white Lamborghini Gallardo.

Charts

Weekly charts

Year-end charts

Certifications

References

2014 singles
2014 songs
Nicky Jam songs
Songs written by Nicky Jam
Sony Music Latin singles
Spanish-language songs